Zero Mile Stone is a monument built by British during the Great Trigonometrical Survey of India in 1907 in Nagpur, Maharashtra. The Zero Mile Stone consists of a pillar made up of sandstone and another small stone representing the GTS Standard Bench Mark, and four stucco horses that were added later. The height of the top of the pillar is 1020.171 feet above mean sea level. In 2008, The Times of India undertook to maintain the monument for the next 5 years.

Contrary to the popular belief, there is no verifiable evidence that it is a monument locating the geographical centre of colonial India in the city of Nagpur, Maharashtra, or that the Zero Mile Stone was erected by the British to use this point to measure all the distances. Nevertheless, the city of Nagpur lies geographically center to all the four major metros of India, viz. Chennai, Mumbai, Kolkata and New Delhi.

The following table gives the distances from Zero Mile in Nagpur to places as marked on the hexagonal base of the pillar

References 

Monuments and memorials in Maharashtra
Tourist attractions in Nagpur
Geographical centres
Kilometre-zero markers